40 is a concert video by the Allman Brothers Band.  It was recorded at the Beacon Theatre in New York City on March 26, 2009.  It was released as a DVD on April 29, 2014.

This concert marked the 40th anniversary of the Allman Brothers Band.  For the occasion they performed all the songs in order from their first two albums, The Allman Brothers Band and Idlewild South.  The show features the 2001 to 2014 lineup of the group – Gregg Allman (keyboards, vocals), Warren Haynes (guitar, vocals), Derek Trucks (guitar), Oteil Burbridge (bass), Butch Trucks (drums), Jaimoe (drums), and Marc Quiñones (congas, percussion, vocals).

Critical reception 
In Glide Magazine Doug Collette wrote, "... 40 is so impeccably recorded in audio and video (the latter of which makes an often cheesy light show look impressive), it is comparable to 2003's Live at the Beacon Theatre DVD... 40'''s skillful camera angles, including as many panoramic shots as face to face close-ups of the players, present a scintillating vision of a band that over the decades has lost, recovered and maintained its unity in such a way it's turned the passage of time into a means of transcendence."

 Track listing First set:"Don't Want You No More" (Spencer Davis, Edward Hardin)
"It's Not My Cross to Bear" (Gregg Allman)
"Black Hearted Woman" (Allman)
"Trouble No More" (McKinley Morganfield)
"Every Hungry Woman" (Allman)
"Dreams" (Allman)
"Whipping Post" (Allman)Second set:''
"Revival" (Dickey Betts)
"Don't Keep Me Wonderin'" (Allman)
"Midnight Rider" (Allman, Robert Kim Payne)
"In Memory of Elizabeth Reed" (Betts)
"Hoochie Coochie Man" (Willie Dixon)
"Please Call Home" (Allman)
"Leave My Blues at Home" (Allman)
Encore:
"Statesboro Blues" (Will McTell)

Personnel 
The Allman Brothers Band
Gregg Allman – Hammond B-3 organ, piano, vocals
Warren Haynes – guitar, vocals
Derek Trucks – guitar
Oteil Burbridge – bass
Butch Trucks – drums
Jaimoe – drums
Marc Quiñones – congas, percussion, vocals
Production
Produced by the Allman Brothers Band
Audio producer: Warren Haynes
Executive producer: Bert Holman
Video director: Craig Grunemeyer
Chief engineer: Edward D'Amico
Live audio engineer: Colin Cargile
Live audio multi-track recording: Bruce "Slim" Judd
Liner notes: John Lynskey

References

External links 

The Allman Brothers Band live albums
The Allman Brothers Band video albums
2014 video albums